Strategic information systems (SIS) are information systems that are developed in response to corporate business initiative. They are intended to give competitive advantage to the organization. They may deliver a product or service that is at a lower cost, that is differentiated, that focuses on a particular market segment￼or is innovative.

Strategic information management (SIM) is a salient feature in the world of information technology (IT). SIM helps businesses and organizations categorize, store, process and transfer the information they create and receive. It also offers tools for helping companies apply metrics and business analytics tools to their information repositories, allowing them to recognize opportunities for growth and identify ways to improve operational efficiency.

References

Sources
 Strategic Information Systems Planning: A Review. Somendra Pant and Cheng Hsu 1995 Information Resources Management Association International Conference, May 21–24, Atlanta, Georgia
 Kichan Nam, S. Rajagopalan, H. Raghav Rao, A. Chaudhury, A two-level investigation of information systems outsourcing, Communications of the ACM, v.39 n.7, p. 36-44, July 1996
 Thompson SH Teo, Yujun Pian, A contingency perspective on internet adoption and competitive advantage, European Journal of Information Systems, v.12 n.2, p. 78-92, June 2003
 Bruce R. Lewis, Terry Anthony Byrd, Development of a measure for the information technology infrastructure construct, European Journal of Information Systems, v.12 n.2, p. 93-109, June 2003
 John Mendonca, Organizational impact of information technology: a leadership course for IT, Proceedings of the 5th conference on Information technology education, October 28–30, 2004, Salt Lake City, UT, USA
 Kun Chang Lee, Sangjae Lee, In Won Kang, KMPI: measuring knowledge management performance, Information and Management, v.42 n.3, p. 469-482, March 2005
 Youlong Zhuang, Albert L. Lederer, A resource-based view of electronic commerce, Information and Management, v.43 n.2, p. 251-261, March 2006
 Kit F. Pun, Clement K. Sankat, Man-Yin R. Yiu, Towards formulating strategy and leveraging performance: a strategic information systems planning approach, International Journal of Computer Applications in Technology, v.28 n.2/3, p. 128-139, April 2007
 Robert M. Brown, Amy W. Gatian, James O. Hicks, Jr., Strategic information systems and financial performance, Journal of Management Information Systems, v.11 n.4, p. 215-248, March 1995
 William R. King, Thompson S. H. Teo, Key dimensions of facilitators and inhibitors for the strategic use of information technology, Journal of Management Information Systems, v.12 n.4, p. 35-53, March 1996
 Rajiv Sabherwal, William R. King, An empirical taxonomy of the decision-making processes concerning strategic applications of information systems, Journal of Management Information Systems, v.11 n.4, p. 177-214, March 1995
 Hong-Mei Chen, Pauline J. Sheldon, Destination information systems: design issues and directions, Journal of Management Information Systems, v.14 n.2, p. 151-176, September 1997
 W. David Wilde, Paul A. Swatman, Federal government policy and community objectives in regional telecommunications: a SISP-based study of Ballarat, Journal of Theoretical and Applied Electronic Commerce Research, v.1 n.1, p. 16-31, April 2006
 Mohsen Akbarpour Shirazi, Javad Soroor, An intelligent agent-based architecture for strategic information system applications, Knowledge-Based Systems, v.20 n.8, p. 726-735, December, 2007
 Rodrigo Magalhaes, A context-based dynamic capability perspective of IS/IT organisational fit, International Journal of Information Systems and Change Management, v.1 n.4, p. 396-420, January 2006
 Thawatchai Jitpaiboon, Sema A. Kalaian, Impacts of IS dependency on IS strategy formulation, International Journal of Information Systems and Change Management, v.1 n.2, p. 187-201, July 2006
 P. Gongla, G. Sakamoto, A. Back-Hock, P. Goldweic, L. Ramos, R. C. Sprowls, C.-K. Kim, SPARKA: a knowledge-based system for identifying competitive uses of information technology, IBM Systems Journal, v.28 n.4, p. 628-645, 1989
 http://monografias.com/trabajos7/chaof/chaof.shtml

Information systems